Dark universe may refer to:

Science
 Portion of the universe not directly observable, including dark energy and dark matter
 Dark Universe Observatory (DUO), a planned NASA space telescope
 Dark Universe Explorer (DUNE), an ESA space telescope

Entertainment
 Dark Universe (novel), a 1961 science fiction novel by Daniel F. Galouye
 Dark Universe (film), a 1993 science-fiction film directed by Steve Latshaw
 The Dark Universe (film), a planned DC Comics comic book film based on Justice League Dark
 Dark Universe, Universal's cancelled cinematic universe featuring their catalogue of horror characters

See also

 Hidden sector (physics) of the universe; the dark universe
 Heat death of the universe, when the universe goes dark in the future
 Dark Ages (cosmology), before the universe lit up in the past
 Universe (disambiguation)
 Dark (disambiguation)
 Hidden universe (disambiguation)